John Orchard (fl. 1417) of Hereford was an English politician.

He was a Member (MP) of the Parliament of England for Hereford in 1417.

References

14th-century births
15th-century deaths
English MPs 1417
People from Hereford